Paul Flexney (born 18 January 1965) is a Scottish retired professional footballer who played as a defender.

Flexney started his career with Clyde, making over 200 appearances for the side. He was capped by Scotland at various youth levels, and was captain for a period during his time at Clyde.

He later played for Northampton Town and Kilmarnock (one season in the Second Division, three in the First Division) before dropping out of the senior game.

He is married to Janice and has one son, Jack, who as of 2019 was following in his father's footsteps towards becoming a professional footballer but was required to undergo brain surgery for cancerous tumours.

References

External links

Living people
1965 births
Scottish footballers
Clyde F.C. players
Northampton Town F.C. players
Kilmarnock F.C. players
Footballers from Glasgow
Association football defenders
Scottish Football League players
English Football League players